Martin Lake is an endorheic freshwater lake in the West Chilcotin area of British Columbia, Canada, situated just north of the community of Tatla Lake, British Columbia. This small alkaline lake has no physical outflow (Martin Lake Creek flows underground) so the water level has been dropping slowly over time. Since the 1980s the lake has divided into two separate lakes with a land bridge between them.

The lake is popular with swimmers in the summer because the shallow depths and lack of inflow and outflow keeps the warmer than other lakes in the Chilcotin. The annual Tatla Lake gymkhana is held every June at the shores of Martin Lake.

The area around Martin Lake is a popular cross country skiing spot with numerous trails linking downtown Tatla Lake and the school with Martin Lake.

Physical Features of the Area

Martin Lake is located on the Chilcotin Plateau at 968m above sea level. The land is flat around the lake, making it ideal for cross country skiing. The dry climate allows for open grasslands interspersed among the lodgepole pine-dominant forest. The open grasslands along with the old abandoned airstrip allow for excellent views of the slow capped Coast Mountains.

It is quite common to find the famous Chilcotin wild horses in the area.

The water is quite basic with a pH of 8.5. The amount of total dissolved solids at the surface is the highest of any lake in the Chilcotin at 757 ppm. This means the water is very hard.

References

Lakes of the Chilcotin
Lakes of British Columbia
Range 2 Coast Land District